Johnson Mountain is a  Navajo Sandstone summit located in Zion National Park, in Washington County of southwest Utah, United States.

Description

It is wedged between the North and East Forks of the Virgin River which drain precipitation runoff from this mountain. Its nearest higher neighbor is The Watchman,  to the north-northeast, and Mount Kinesava is positioned  directly across the canyon to the northwest. Shunesburg Mountain is set  to the southeast, directly across the mouth of Parunuweap Canyon. This feature's name was officially adopted in 1934 by the U.S. Board on Geographic Names. It is named for Nephi Johnson (1833–1919), a Mormon missionary, interpreter, explorer, and the first white man to visit Zion Canyon. In 1858 a Paiute guide by the name of Nauguts led Nephi into the Zion Canyon area of the upper Virgin River. Johnson wrote a favorable report about the agricultural potential of the upper Virgin River basin, where he founded the town of Virgin.

Climate
Spring and fall are the most favorable seasons to visit Johnson Mountain. According to the Köppen climate classification system, it is located in a Cold semi-arid climate zone, which is defined by the coldest month having an average mean temperature below , and at least 50% of the total annual precipitation being received during the spring and summer.

Gallery

See also

 Geology of the Zion and Kolob canyons area
 Colorado Plateau

References

External links

 Zion National Park National Park Service
 Weather: Johnson Mountain
 Johnson Mountain Rock Climbing: mountainproject.com
 Nephi Johnson biography: Washington County Historical Society

Mountains of Utah
Zion National Park
Mountains of Washington County, Utah
Sandstone formations of the United States
North American 1000 m summits